The 1921 Western State Normal Hilltoppers football team represented Western State Normal School (later renamed Western Michigan University) as an independent during the 1921 college football season.  In their 15th and final season under head coach William H. Spaulding, the Hilltoppers compiled a 6–2 record and outscored their opponents, 262 to 40. Tackle Reed Waterman was the team captain.

Schedule

References

Western State Normal
Western Michigan Broncos football seasons
Western State Normal Hilltoppers football